Alone was the debut album by Swedish singer Stephen Simmonds. It was first released in 1997 in Sweden and later in Japan.  In 1998 and 2000 in UK and United States it went by the name Spirit Tales.

Japan Release (1997): "Alone" was also released in Japan, Simmonds added a recording from 1995 "Thank You For" (one of the tracks from the demo which was sent to diesel music), the song "One" which was on the "b-side" of the "Tears Never Dry" single and also a remix of the song "Alone".

UK Release (1998): "Alone" was renamed to "Spirit Tales" and was additionally produced and mixed on all the tracks except: "Tears Never Dry", "Alone" Judgement day" and "Let It Go". Songs "One" and "Believe" was added to the album.

US Release (2000): Simmonds worked with Raphael Saadiq and 2 Danish producers based in LA at the time called Soulshock and Karlin and added the tracks "If I Was Your Man" (co-written and produced by Raphael Saadiq) and "I Can't Do That" (co-written and produced by Soulshock and Karlin).

Track listing for Alone
 All songs written by Stephen Simmonds, except as noted
 Alone
 Tears Never Dry
 Now's The Time
 For You
 Universe
 Searchin'
 All The People
 Get Down
 Let It Go
 Hope U Do
 Judgement Day

Japan edition
Added tracks (Alone album)
 One
 Thank You For
 Alone "Funkyman mix" (featuring Big L & Marquee)

Track listing for Spirit Tales

Japan Edition
Added tracks (Spirit Tales album)
Alone (Funkyman Mix feat. Big L & Marquee)
I Can't Do That (M.A.W. Vocal)

UK edition
Added tracks (Spirit Tales album 1998)
Believe
One

US edition
Added tracks (Spirit Tales album 2000)
I Can't Do That (Stephen Simmonds, Carsten Schack, Kenneth Karlin, Francois de Roubaix)
If I Was Your Man (Stephen Simmonds, Raphael Saadiq)

Singles
Tears Never Dry
Now's The Time
Alone
I Can't Do That (US)
Get Down (US)

1997 debut albums
Stephen Simmonds albums